Emirates Dubai Television was a television channel transmitting terrestrially out of Dubai in Arabic targeting the expat community in the U.A.E. It was founded in 1979. It started transmitting via satellite in 1995 using the original Hot Bird satellite. In 2004, it changed its identity completely and is now known as Dubai TV and is part of DMI.

The Emirates Dubai Television originally broadcast locally on two frequencies: One which kept the channel's programming open the whole day, whilst the other was adjacently switched in favour of Channel 33's 12-hour English programming beginning at 4:00 pm, later extending to 2:00 pm UAE time.

See also
 Dubai TV
 Dubai 33

Television channels and stations established in 1979
Television channels and stations disestablished in 2004
Television stations in the United Arab Emirates
Mass media in Dubai

be:Эмірацкае Дубайскае тэлебачанне